{{Infobox radio station
| name                = DZTR (Radyo Natin Naga)
| logo                = 
| city                = Naga
| area                = Camarines Sur and surrounding areas
| branding            = 89.5 Radyo Natin
| airdate             = 
| frequency           = 89.5 MHz
| format              = Community radio
| language            = Bicolano, Filipino
| licensing_authority = NTC
| power               = 5,000 watts
| erp                 = 20,000 watts
| class               = 
| callsign_meaning    = Tabora Radio| network             = Radyo Natin Network
| owner               = Manila Broadcasting Company
| sister_stations     = 99.1 Love Radio Naga, DZRH Naga
| licensee            = Cebu Broadcasting Company
| webcast             = Listen Live
| website             =  
}}DZTR (89.5 FM), on-air as 89.5 Radyo Natin, is a radio station owned and operated by Manila Broadcasting Company through its licensee Cebu Broadcasting Company. The station's studio is located at the 3rd Floor, Naga City Market, Naga City, Camarines Sur.Media in Naga City

The station was inaugurated in 1998 as Yes FM. In 2005, Ateneo de Naga University took over the station's operations and rebranded it as The Beat FM'''. It aired Top 40 rock hits until the show went off the air in 2009. On January 4, 2010, it was relaunched with a mainstream Top 40 format. During that time, its studios were located at the Phelan Bldg., Ateneo de Naga University. In 2014, it went off the air due to technical difficulties. In 2016, Radyo Natin Network took over the station's operations. Unlike other stations, this station is full power similar to Cagayan de Oro station.

References

Radio stations in Naga, Camarines Sur
Radio stations established in 1998
Radyo Natin Network stations